The athletics competitions at the 2018 African Youth Games in Algiers, Algeria was held between 24 and 27 July at the July 5, 1962 Stadium. The competition served as the qualification for the 2018 Summer Youth Olympics which took place in October 2018 in Buenos Aires, Argentina.

The competition was dominated by South Africa which took 26 medals in total including 12 golds, followed by Nigeria and Ethiopia.

Medal summary

Boys

Girls

Medal table

References

Results

2018
African Youth Games
2018
Athletics